Vardnili Hydro Power Plant Cascade is a cascade of hydropower plants in the Gali Municipality of Georgia. Included in the Cascade of Enguri Hydropower Plants. It consists of four relatively smaller power plants (Vardnil HPP-I, Vardnil HPP-II, Vardnil HPP-III, Vardnil HPP-IV). It is built on the outlet channel of the Enguri Hydro Power Plant, by discharging the main runoff of the Enguri River into the Eristskali riverbed. The total projected installed capacity is 340 MW, and the average annual projected electricity output is 1111 million kWh.
The Vardnil HPP-I has 3 turbines with a nominal capacity of 73 MW each having a total capacity of 220 MW.

See also

 List of power stations in Georgia (country)
 Energy in Georgia (country)

References

Hydroelectric power stations in Georgia (country)